Weston Dennis, better known as Westballz, is an American professional Super Smash Bros. Melee player from Burbank, California. Widely considered one of the game's best and most technical Falco players, he has defeated several top professional players in tournament including Joseph "Mango" Marquez, Juan "Hungrybox" DeBiedma, Kevin "PPMD" Nanney and William "Leffen" Hjelte. A 2021 list compiled by PGstats ranked Dennis as the 26th-greatest Melee player of all time.

Dennis has previously been sponsored by Tempo Storm, G2 Esports and Thunder Gaming.

Personal life
Westballz grew up in Burbank, California and attended John Burroughs High School.

References

External links
 

Super Smash Bros. Melee players
Tempo Storm players
Living people
People from Burbank, California
American esports players
G2 Esports players
1991 births